Tasiusaq may refer to the following placenames in Greenland:

 Tasiusaq, Kujalleq, a settlement in Kujalleq municipality in southern Greenland.
 Tasiusaq, Avannaata, a settlement in Avannaata municipality in northwestern Greenland.
 Tasiusaq Bay, a bay in Avannaata municipality in northwestern Greenland.